Group 2 of UEFA Euro 1980 began on 12 June 1980, and ended on 18 June 1980. The pool was made up of Belgium, England, hosts Italy, and Spain.

Teams

Standings

In the knockout stage,
The winner of Group 2, Belgium, advanced to play the winner of Group 1, West Germany, in the final.
The runner-up of Group 2, Italy, advanced to play the runner-up of Group 1, Czechoslovakia, in the third place play-off.

Matches

Belgium vs England

Spain vs Italy

Belgium vs Spain

England vs Italy

Spain vs England

Italy vs Belgium

References

External links
UEFA Euro 1980 Group 2

Group 2
Italy at UEFA Euro 1980
England at UEFA Euro 1980
Spain at UEFA Euro 1980
Belgium at UEFA Euro 1980